Parliamentary elections were held in the Free City of Danzig on 7 April 1935. The Nazi Party emerged as the largest party, receiving 59% of the vote and winning 43 of the 72 seats in the Volkstag. Voter turnout was reportedly over 99%.

Campaign
Hermann Rauschning, the Nazi President of the Senate of Danzig, was removed from his position by Albert Forster and replaced by Arthur Greiser in November 1934. Rauschning appealed to the public not to vote for the Nazis in the 1935 elections.

Political opposition to the Nazis was repressed, with several politicians being imprisoned and murdered.

Results

Aftermath
At the opening session of Danzig’s parliament on 30 April 1935, the representatives of the democratic parties declared that its composition did not reflect the will of the people and that an examination of the election should take place. The fastest way to new elections would have been the self-dissolution of the Volkstag but this was rejected by the majority of its members. Directly after the election, the democratic parties submitted a series of appeals against the election result with Danzig’s Supreme Court. On 30 October 1935, a hearing was held before the First Civil Senate of the Danzig Supreme Court, chaired by its President, Walter von Hagens. The court looked at the reported cases and heard 988 witnesses. On 14 November 1935, the verdict was proclaimed. The Supreme Court found many cases of electoral fraud and confirmed the opposition parties’ view that state institutions had interfered in favour of the Nazi party (NSDAP). However, the election result was not declared entirely invalid. Instead, it was decided that the Nazi party would be deducted 3% of votes in the cities and 10% in the rural communities. In eighteen rural communities, the election manipulations were deemed so severe that the local results there were declared invalid. In total, the Nazi party lost 10,804 votes and was deducted a seat in the parliament, which went to the Social Democrats.

The economic policy of Danzig's Nazi-led government, which increased the public issues for employment-creation programs, and the retrenchment of financial aid from Germany led to a devaluation of more than 40% of the Danziger Gulden in 1935. The gold reserves of the Bank of Danzig declined from 30 million Gulden in 1933 to 13 million in 1935 and the foreign asset reserve from 10 million to 250,000 Gulden. In 1935, Poland protested when Danzig's Senate reduced the value of the Gulden to parity with the Polish Zloty.

References

Elections in the Free City of Danzig
Danzig
Election and referendum articles with incomplete results